Dalen Church is a parish church of the Church of Norway in Folldal Municipality in Innlandet county, Norway. It is located in the village of Dalholen. It is the church for the Øvre Folldal parish which is part of the Nord-Østerdal prosti (deanery) in the Diocese of Hamar. The white, wooden church was built in an long church design in 1933 using plans drawn up by the architect Einar Landmark. The church seats about 252 people.

History
In 1914 or 1915, a cemetery was built in Dalholen to serve the upper Folldalen valley. Less than 20 years later, the parish began planning for the construction of a new church at the cemetery. Einar Landmark was hired to design the new church. It was built in 1933 and consecrated in 1934. It is a wooden long church with a rectangular nave and a smaller, narrower choir with a lower roof line. There is a bell tower on the west end of the nave's roof. There's also a small church porch on the west end of the building.

Media gallery

See also
List of churches in Hamar

References

Folldal
Churches in Innlandet
Long churches in Norway
Wooden churches in Norway
20th-century Church of Norway church buildings
Churches completed in 1933
1933 establishments in Norway